The GNoSR Classes X and Y were two similar classes of 0-4-2T steam locomotives built by Manning Wardle for the Great North of Scotland Railway. The two classes were similar, and were used throughout their lives to shunt on the docks at Aberdeen. They passed to the London and North Eastern Railway at the 1923 grouping, and received the LNER classification Z5. The Class X were later reclassified Z4.

History
When the Aberdeen Harbour Commissioners finally agreed to allow steam locomotives to replace horses on the Aberdeen docks, the GNoSR purchased two 0-4-2T locomotives from Manning Wardle for the purpose. These were designated Class Y and numbered 114 and 115. On delivery these were found to be 2 tons over the maximum weight for operating on the docks,<ref

name="Z5">
</ref> and a further two locomotives of similar design were acquired. These Class X locomotives, numbered 116 and 117, had smaller driving wheels and a shorter wheelbase. In order to reduce the weight of the Class Y locos, they initially operated with their tanks only partially filled.

They remained in the GNoSR livery of black with red and yellow lining until painted unlined black during World War II, although they gained the letters LNER and subsequently acquired BR emblems. The locos also retained their original boilers, there being no spares. Except when on hire to industrial concerns, the locomotives were shedded at Kittybrewster.

The first loco to be withdrawn was 68193 in 1956, followed by 68191 in 1959. The remaining two locos were withdrawn in 1960.

Classification and numbering
After the grouping both the Class X and Class Y became LNER Class Z5. This was changed in 1927 when the Class X was redesignated LNER Class Z4.

References

X
0-4-2T locomotives
Manning Wardle locomotives
Railway locomotives introduced in 1915
Scrapped locomotives
Standard gauge steam locomotives of Great Britain
Shunting locomotives